The Central District of Hoveyzeh County is a district (bakhsh) in Hoveyzeh County, Khuzestan Province, Iran. At the 2006 census, its population was 22,523, in 4,082 families.  The district has one city: Hoveyzeh.  The district has one rural district (dehestan): Hoveyzeh Rural District.

References 

Hoveyzeh County
Districts of Khuzestan Province